"Little Numbers" is a song by Swiss-German pop duo BOY. It was written by band members Valeska Steiner and Sonja Glass for their debut studio album Mutual Friends (2011), while production was helmed by Philipp Steinke. The song was released as the band's debut single in August 2011. A folkish indie pop song, the uptempo track is built almost entirely on drums and piano. Lyrically, "Little Numbers" depicts its protagonist waiting for a call from their love interest, while killing time by daydreaming.

The song gained significant popularity in German-speaking Europe after being featured in German airline Lufthansa's Business Class commercial in mid-2012. It also served as the theme song for the German comedy film  (2011) as well as the television comedy series Knallerfrauen, and was also featured in the American film How to Be Single (2016). While "Little Numbers" became a moderate commercial success in Europe, it reached number 4 on the Japan Hot 100 chart.

Track listing

Charts

Weekly charts

References

2011 singles
2011 songs